The 31st International 500-Mile Sweepstakes was held at Indianapolis Motor Speedway on Friday, May 30, 1947. It was the opening round of the 11 races that comprised the 1947 AAA Championship Car season. The 1946 winner, George Robson, had been killed on September 2, 1946 in a racing incident.  Driver Shorty Cantlon would be killed in a racing incident during the race.

Beginning in 1947 the Speedway issued "Bronze" and "Silver" badges.  Bronze badges allowed gate and garage access during the month and silver badges did the same but also allowed pit access.  On race day, one needed a Back Up Card Early bronze badges were indeed bronze, but silver badges were only a silver colored pot metal.  Bronze badges began being made of a bronze colored pot metal sometime in the late 1950's or early 1960's.

Time trials & ASPAR boycott
Time trials was scheduled for five days. The minimum speed to qualify was set at 115 mph. In the months leading up to the race, several top drivers that were members of a union, the American Society of Professional Auto Racing (ASPAR), threatened to boycott the race over the purse size. The AAA Contest Board refused to heed their demands, and when the entry list was closed on May 8, many of the top drivers, particularly several popular west coast drivers, were not on the list. A total of 35 cars were entered, but at least nine had no driver listed, and 13 of the entries were inexperienced novice drivers. After the practice began for the month, officials decreed that the boycotting drivers would not be allowed late entry. After several weeks of dispute, an agreement was made for the ASPAR drivers to participate midway through the month.

Saturday May 17 - Pole Day
Rain, and the holdout of several ASPAR drivers, meant only seven cars completed qualifying runs. Ted Horn claimed the pole position with a speed of 126.564 mph.
Sunday May 18
Three cars qualified, bringing the field to 10 cars.
Saturday May 24
Sunday May 25
Wednesday May 28
The final day of qualifying closed with 28 cars in the field.

When qualifying closed at 6 p.m. on Wednesday May 28, the field had only been filled to 28 cars. Duke Dinsmore was the final qualifier, completing his run amidst some scoring confusion by the officials, just as the time had run out. Race officials initially stressed that Wednesday would be the final day available to qualify. However, a day later, they re-opened qualifying for one hour late on Thursday May 29 in an effort to fill the field. Mel Hansen and Emil Andres were the only two cars to complete attempts, and after approval by the other entries, were added to the grid to bring the field to 30 cars.

The heartbreak story of the day belonged to driver Billy Devore. After failing to make the field on Wednesday, the Bill Schoof crew worked diligently to make repairs to their car, hoping that officials would re-open qualifying. When word was announced that additional time trials would be held Thursday, the crew scrambled to get the car prepared. Late in the evening, with about 20 minutes left until closing, the crew drove the race car from their garage about six miles away to the track with a police escort. When they arrived at the gate at 6:58 p.m., however, officials closed time trials, and DeVore was not permitted to qualify.

Starting grid

Failed to Qualify

Walt Ader  (#6)
Zora Arkus-Duntov  (#49)
Bud Bardowski 
Tommy Boggs  (#23)
Frank Brisko
Leslie Brooke  (#35)
Jim Brubaker  (#86)
Red Byron  (#22)
Duane Carter  (#32)
Hal Cole - Withdrew due to ASPAR dispute
Charles Crawford (#67)
Billy Devore (#17)
Louis Durant (#23)
Sam Grecco  (#51)
Sam Hanks (#54)
Tommy Hinnershitz (#5) - Did not arrive
Norm Houser  (#69)
Danny Kladis - Withdrew due to ASPAR dispute
Johnny Mauro  (#64)
Harry McQuinn
George Metzler  (#55)
Chet Miller - Withdrew due to ASPAR dispute
Wally Mitchell  - Withdrew due to ASPAR dispute
Overton Phillips - Withdrew due to ASPAR dispute
Buddy Rusch 
Art Scovell 
Bill Sheffler - Withdrew due to ASPAR dispute
Hal Stetson  - Did not appear
Joel Thorne - Withdrew due to ASPAR dispute
Louis Tomei (#44, #57)
Steve Truchan  (#28)
George Weaver  (#44)
Doc Williams (#54)

Race summary
Late in the race, Lou Moore teammates Bill Holland and Mauri Rose were running 1st and 2nd. The pit crew displayed a confusing chalkboard sign with the letters "EZY" to Holland, presumably meaning for him to take the final laps at a reduced pace to safely make it to the finish. Mauri Rose ignored the board, and charged to catch up to Holland. Holland believed he held a lap lead over Rose, and allowed him to catch up. The two drivers waved as Rose passed Holland, with Holland believing it was not more than a congratulatory gesture.

In reality, the pass Rose made was for the lead, and he led the final 8 laps to take the controversial victory. The race was marred by a 41st lap crash that claimed the life of Shorty Cantlon.

Rose's distance finish time of 4:17:52.17 was the second fastest finish of the Indianapolis 500 ever, at the time. Only the 1938 Indianapolis 500 had been completed in a faster total time as of 1947. After Rose completed the 500 mile distance, approximately 40 minutes was given for additional drivers to finish, before any remaining drivers who had not completed the distance by then were flagged off the track. The 1947 race was also the coldest on record, with an average temperature of 50 degrees and morning low of 37.

Results

* Cliff Bergere relieved Herb Ardinger after his own car retired from the race, and completed the race distance in the #54 car.

Broadcasting

Radio
The race was carried live on the Mutual Broadcasting System, the precursor to the IMS Radio Network. The broadcast was sponsored by Perfect Circle Piston Rings and Bill Slater served as the anchor. The broadcast feature live coverage of the start, the finish, and live updates throughout the race.

Barry Lake served as "roving reporter," stationed on an Army Jeep. Larry Richardson was stationed in the new Press Paddock (constructed underneath the Paddock Penthouse upper deck) on the outside of the mainstretch, relaying scoring and official information.

See also
 1947 AAA Championship Car season

Notes

Works cited

1947 Indianapolis 500 Radio Broadcast, Mutual: Re-broadcast on "The All-Night Race Party" - WIBC-AM (May 29, 2004)

References

Indianapolis 500 races
Indianapolis 500
Indianapolis 500
1947 in American motorsport
May 1947 sports events in the United States